Mitaera Ngatae Teatuakaro Michael Tavioni  (born 1947) is a Cook Islands artist and writer. A master carver, he has been described as a taonga (treasure). His role in the pacific art community is recognised from New Zealand to Hawaii.

Tavioni was born on Rarotonga. He was educated at Tereora College, then at Northland College, Kaikohe and Massey University in New Zealand, graduating with a degree in Agriculture & Horticulture. After working as a public servant in the Agriculture Department, he became a full-time artist. In 2019 he graduated with a Master of Fine Arts from Auckland University of Technology.

He has worked in a wide variety of mediums, including printing, painting, wood, stone, and bone, as well as traditional tattooing. In 1975 he began printing t-shirts using wooden blocks. He experimented with other mediums, but initially found it difficult to obtain tools and materials. In 1996 he oversaw the creation of the Punanga Nui market. In 2002 he published a poetry collection, Speak Your Truth. His work is displayed at the Punanga Nui in Avarua and the University of the South Pacific campus. In 2016 he was commissioned, alongside New Zealand-based artist Michel Tuffery, to create a carved wooden gateway for the RSA memorial cemetery to commemorate the centenary of Cook Islands participation in the First World War.

Tavioni unsuccessfully stood as a candidate for the Unity party in the 1978 Cook Islands general election. He later stood as a candidate for the Te Kura O Te ʻAu People's Movement in Avatiu–Ruatonga–Palmerston in the 2010 election.

Tavioni now runs a gallery and art school in Rarotonga, where he teaches traditional vaka-making. In 2021 he was the subject of a short documentary film, Taonga: An Artists Activist.

In the 2022 Birthday Honours he was awarded the British Empire Medal for services to the arts and to the community.

Images

References

Massey University alumni
Auckland University of Technology alumni
Cook Island artists
People from Rarotonga
1947 births
Living people
Woodcarvers
Cook Island poets